Murad Magomedkhanovich Machaev (born December 3, 1986 in Dagestan) is a Russian mixed martial artist, who currently fighting in the  lightweight division for the Absolute Championship Berkut (ACB), Eurasia Fight Nights Global and Bellator MMA veteran, he is the winner of the 2011 Fedor Emelianenko Cup.

Background
Murad Machaev was born on December 3, 1986, in the former Soviet Union, Dagestan ASSR, Makhachkala in modern-day Dagestan, Russia. Before student life he began trained in Freestyle Wrestling but join to Sambo. He lost to Amirkhan Mazihov in 68 kg final match and became silver medal in Southern Federal District Combat Sambo Championships 2007 in Armavir, Krasnodar Krai, Russia.

Mixed martial arts career

Bellator MMA
In August 2012, it was announced that Machaev had signed a contract with Bellator.

Machaev faced Marcin Held in the opening round of the Lightweight tournament on October 19, 2012 at Bellator 77. He lost via unanimous decision (29–28, 29–28, 29–28).

Machaev faced Lorawnt-T Nelson on November 16, 2012 at Bellator 81. He won the fight via unanimous decision (30–27, 30–27, 30–27).

Fight Nights MMA
Machaev faced Ivica Truscek on December 16, 2012 at Fight Nights Global 9. He won via submission in the first round.

Machaev faced Andrius Hobaldo on April 20, 2013 at Fight Nights Global 11. He won via KO in first round.

Machaev faced Alexei Angelovskiy on September 30, 2014 at Fight Nights Global: Battle of Moscow 17. He won via submission in the first round.

Machaev faced Niko Puhakka on December 20, 2014 at Fight Nights Global: Battle of Moscow 18. He won via TKO (punches) in the second round.

Machaev faced Dagestani Islam Begidov on March 21, 2015 at Fight Nights Global: Moscow Cup. He won via TKO (punches) in the second round.

Machaev faced Bellator Tournament runner-up Alexander Sarnavskiy on February 26, 2016 at Fight Nights Global 44. He won the fight via unanimous decision.

Machaev faced Jack McGann on September 25, 2016 at Fight Nights Global 51. He won the fight via submission in the second round.

Machaev lost to UFC veteran Diego Brandão via submission on 28 January, 2017 at Fight Nights 58.

Absolute Championship Berkut

Machaev signed a six-fight deal with the ACB in December 2017.

Championships and accomplishments

Mixed martial arts
 World Absolute Fighting Championship
 2010 Volga Federal District Open Lightweight Tournament Winner
 Fight Nights
 Battle of Moscow 1 Lightweight Tournament Winner

Sambo
 All-Russian Sambo Federation
 Russian Combat Sambo National Championship Runner-up (2012)
 Russian Combat Sambo National Championship 3rd Place (2010)
 2010 A.A. Kharlampiev Memorial Combat Sambo Silver Medalist
 2007 Southern Federal District Championships Combat Sambo Silver Medalist
 Combat Sambo Federation of Russia
 Russian Combat Sambo National Championship 3rd Place (2008)
 World Combat Sambo Federation
 European Combat Sambo Championships 2012 in Moscow, NC (headbutt and broken nose)

Mixed martial arts record

|-
|Win
|align=center|21–2
|Ary Santos
|Submission (rear-naked choke)
|Fight Nights Global 67: Brandão vs. Galiev
|
|align=center|1
|align=center|4:50
|Yekaterinburg, Sverdlovsk oblast, Russia
|
|-
|Loss
|align=center|20–2
|Diego Brandao
|Submission (helicopter armbar)
|Fight Nights Global 58: Brandão vs. Machaev
|
|align=center|2
|align=center|0:58
|Makhachkala, Dagestan, Russia
|
|-
|Win
|align=center|20–1
|Jack McGann
|Submission (rear-naked choke)
|Fight Nights Global 51: Pavlovich vs. Gelegaev
|
|align=center|2
|align=center|4:48
|Makhachkala, Dagestan, Russia
|
|-
|Win
|align=center|19–1
|Alexander Sarnavskiy
|Decision (unanimous)
|Fight Nights Global 44: Machaev vs. Sarnavskiy
|
|align=center|3
|align=center|5:00
|Moscow, Moscow Oblast, Russia
|
|-
|Win
|align=center|18–1
|Sergej Grecicho
|Decision (unanimous)
|Mix Fight Combat
|
|align=center|3
|align=center|5:00
|Moscow, Moscow Oblast, Russia
|
|-
|Win
|align=center|17–1
|Islam Begidov
|TKO (punches)
|Fight Nights: Moscow Cup
|
|align=center|2
|align=center|2:38
|Moscow, Moscow Oblast, Russia
|
|-
|Win
|align=center|16–1
|Niko Puhakka
|TKO (punches)
|Fight Nights: Battle of Moscow 18
|
|align=center|2
|align=center|4:30
|Moscow, Moscow Oblast, Russia
|
|-
|Win
|align=center|15–1
|Alexei Angelovskiy
|Submission (armbar)
|Fight Nights: Battle of Moscow 17
|
|align=center|1
|align=center|3:29
|Moscow, Moscow Oblast, Russia
|
|-
|Win
|align=center|14–1
|Alexey Polpudnikov
|Decision (unanimous)
|Khabarovsk Mayor's MMA Cup 2014
|
|align=center|2
|align=center|5:00
|Khabarovsk, Khabarovsk Krai, Russia
|
|-
|Win
|align=center|13–1
|Gokhan Turkyilmaz
|Submission (rear-naked choke)
|Dare Fight Sports: Rebels of MMA
|
|align=center|1
|align=center|N/A
|Bangkok, Chao Phraya River, Thailand
|
|-
|Win
|align=center|12–1
|Andrius Hobaldo
|KO (punches)
|Fight Nights 11
|
|align=center|1
|align=center|2:44
|Moscow, Moscow Oblast, Russia
|
|-
|Win
|align=center|11–1
|Ivica Truscek
|Submission (D'arce choke)
|Fight Nights: Battle of Moscow 9
|
|align=center|1
|align=center|2:14
|Moscow, Moscow Oblast, Russia
|
|-
|Win
|align=center|10–1
|Lorawnt-T Nelson
|Decision (unanimous)
|Bellator 81
|
|align=center|3
|align=center|5:00
|Kingston, Rhode Island, United States
|
|-
|Loss
|align=center|9–1
|Marcin Held
|Decision (unanimous)
|Bellator 77
|
|align=center|3
|align=center|5:00
|Reading, Pennsylvania, United States
|
|-
|Win
|align=center|9–0
|Cesario di Domenico
|Decision (unanimous)
|United Glory 15 - 2012 Glory World Series
|
|align=center|3
|align=center|5:00
|Moscow, Moscow Oblast, Russia
|
|-
|Win
|align=center|8–0
|Alymbek Nasipov
|TKO (retirement)
|Fights With Rules 3
|
|align=center|1
|align=center|5:00
|Ufa, Republic of Bashkortostan, Russia
|
|-
|Win
|align=center|7–0
|Vadim Ryazanov
|Submission (armbar)
|Draka - Governor's Cup 2010
|
|align=center|2
|align=center|0:57
|Khabarovsk, Khabarovsk Krai, Russia
|
|-
|Win
|align=center|6–0
|Alexandr Shmelev
|Submission (rear-naked choke)
|World Absolute FC
|
|align=center|1
|align=center|4:15
|Cheboksary, Chuvash Republic, Russia
|
|-
|Win
|align=center|5–0
|Magomedrasul Omarov
|Submission (rear-naked choke)
|World Absolute FC
|
|align=center|1
|align=center|3:37
|Cheboksary, Chuvash Republic, Russia
|
|-
|Win
|align=center|4–0
|Zubaira Tukhugov
|Submission (rear-naked choke)
|Fight Nights: Battle of Moscow 1
|
|align=center|1
|align=center|1:17
|Moscow, Moscow Oblast, Russia
|
|-
|Win
|align=center|3–0
|Serob Minasyan
|Decision (unanimous)
|Fight Nights: Battle of Moscow 1
|
|align=center|2
|align=center|5:00
|Moscow, Moscow Oblast, Russia
|
|-
|Win
|align=center|2–0
|Yuri Berzegov
|TKO (punches)
|Pancration SFD Championship 2
|
|align=center|1
|align=center|3:18
|Cherkessk, Karachay-Cherkess Republic, Russia
|
|-
|Win
|align=center|1–0
|Zaur Bostanov
|Submission (rear-naked choke)
|Pancration SFD Championship 1
|
|align=center|1
|align=center|4:25
|Cherkessk, Karachay-Cherkess Republic, Russia
|

References

External links
 

1986 births
Dagestani mixed martial artists
Lightweight mixed martial artists
Living people
Avar people
Sportspeople from Makhachkala
Russian male mixed martial artists
Mixed martial artists utilizing sambo
Mixed martial artists utilizing Brazilian jiu-jitsu
Russian sambo practitioners
Russian practitioners of Brazilian jiu-jitsu